The S41 is a regional railway line of the Zürich S-Bahn on the ZVV (Zürich transportation network).

Route 
 

The line runs on the Winterthur–Bülach–Koblenz railway and serves the following stations:

 Winterthur Hauptbahnhof
 Winterthur Töss
 Winterthur Wülflingen
 Pfungen-Neftenbach
 Embrach-Rorbas
 Bülach

Rolling stock 
Initially, the line was served by Swiss Federal Railways' push-pull trains. All services are now operated by electrically powered Stadler GTW trains belonging to the THURBO railway company.

Scheduling 
The train frequency between Winterthur Hauptbahnhof and Bülach is one every 30 minutes.

History 

Before 2019, the S41 was extended once an hour from Bülach to Waldshut.

See also 

 Rail transport in Switzerland
 Trams in Zürich

References

External links 
 
 ZVV official website: Routes & zones

Zürich S-Bahn lines
Transport in Aargau
Transport in the canton of Zürich
Transport in Baden-Württemberg